The Super Bowl XXIII halftime show took place on January 22, 1989 at the Joe Robbie Stadium in Miami, Florida. It was entitled "BeBop Bamboozled in 3-D". It featured a 1950s theme, an Elvis impersonator, 3D effects (for the broadcast audience), and a magic trick.

Selection of MagiCom Entertainment as producer
The NFL was looking to find new producers and ideas for its halftime shows in the years 1988, 1989, and 1990. NFL officials met with several individuals, among them was Dan Witkowski, a veteran stage illusionist and owner of the small company MagicCom,  He did not give them specifics for a show at the meeting, but rather asked for the opportunity to give a formal presentation to them, which was granted. To pique the interest of the league officials, Witkowski put a padlock on the leather-bound pitch books he sent to the member of the league's halftime show selection committee ahead of his presentation. After his presentation, Witkowski and his company were given the opportunity to co-produce the 1988 Super Bowl pre-game show (as a dry-run of sorts) in addition to the 1989 halftime show.

Production
The halftime show created was titled "BeBop Bamboozled". 

It was decided that the show would have a 1950s theme. The show featured an Elvis impersonator dubbed "Elvis Presto", played by then-Solid Gold dancer Alex Cole. Despite this, not one actual Elvis Presley song was performed, and the show instead featured songs from musicals among other tunes. Cole had not originally been the individual cast to impersonate Elvis. Rather, he was the choreographer for an individual cast, who had previously played Elvis on Broadway.  When that individual backed out, Cole was cast in his place. The vocals of "Elvis Presto" were pre-recorded, performed by Jody LoMedico.

The show featured roughly 2,000 South Florida-area dancers and performers. Among the choreographers was June Taylor. Donald Pippin was in charge of the music.

A number of magic tricks had been considered by Witkowski. It was decided that their big trip would be a large-scale card trick.

The show also featured the use of 102 custom-made Harley Davidson motorcycles, as well as pink Cadillacs and fireworks.

Several scenes included computer generated 3D images. Prior to the game, Coca-Cola distributed 3-D glasses at retailers for viewers to use. At the start of the halftime show, primary sponsor Diet Coke aired the first commercial in 3D. Coca-Cola had originally planned to use the 3D Diet Coke commercial as part of the Moonlighting season finale, which was also aired in 3D, but withdrew plans due to the 1988 Writers Guild of America Strike. This made the show the first  3D television event to be broadcast. Coca-Cola manufactured 26 million pairs of 3D glasses, despite the Super Bowl having a much greater audience.

Synopsis

The show began with a pre-taped introduction by Bob Costas, followed by the 3D Diet Coke commercial.

The show then began with "Elvis Presto" (an Elvis Presley impersonator), the performance's emcee, appearing from inside a jukebox.

Various songs were performed. Ironically, none of them were Elvis Presley songs.

Among the stunts in the show was the appearance of dancers defying gravity by leaning horizontally against parking meters.

3D visual graphics were incorporated into the broadcast.

A card trick was performed. Presto urged the stadium audience to pick one of four cards, and an applause meter indicated which card the audience had chosen.

Setlist

Critical reception

Writing for the Sun Sentinel, Jack Zink compared the show to the Ringling Bros. and Barnum & Bailey Circus. He also opined that the "pregame entertainment was more enjoyable". Many outlets have retrospectively ranked the show as among the worst halftime performances.

References

1989 in American television
1989 in Florida
023
January 1989 events in the United States